African Groove is an album released by Putumayo World Music on 22 April 2003. It consists of tracks by various artists, mixing the styles of African dance music with electronica and hip-hop.

Part of the Putumayo Grooves series, African Groove was released after the highly successful albums Arabic Groove, Latin Groove and Asian Groove.

References

2003 compilation albums